The effective stress can be defined as the stress, depending on the applied tension  and pore pressure , which controls the strain or strength behaviour of soil and rock (or a generic porous body) for whatever pore pressure value or, in other terms, the stress which applied over a dry porous body (i.e. at ) provides the same strain or strength behaviour which is observed at  ≠ 0. In the case of granular media it can be viewed as a force that keeps a collection of particles rigid. Usually this applies to sand, soil, or gravel, as well as every kind of rock and several other porous materials such as concrete, metal powders, biological tissues etc. The usefulness of an appropriate ESP formulation consists in allowing to assess the behaviour of a porous body for whatever pore pressure value on the basis of experiments involving dry samples (i.e. carried out at zero pore pressure).

History 
Karl von Terzaghi first proposed the relationship for effective stress in 1925. For him, the term "effective" meant the calculated stress that was effective in moving soil, or causing displacements. It has been often interpreted as the average stress carried by the soil skeleton. Afterwards, different formulations have been proposed for the effective stress. Maurice Biot fully developed the three-dimensional soil consolidation theory, extending the one-dimensional model previously developed by Terzaghi to more general hypotheses and introducing the set of basic equations of Poroelasticity. Alec Skempton in his work in 1960, has carried out an extensive review of available formulations and experimental data in literature about effective stress valid in soil, concrete and rock, in order to reject some of these expressions, as well as clarify what expression was appropriate according to several work hypotheses, such as stress–strain or strength behaviour, saturated or nonsaturated media, rock/concrete or soil behaviour, etc.

Description
Effective stress (σ') acting on a soil is calculated from two parameters, total stress (σ) and pore water pressure (u) according to:

Typically, for simple examples

Much like the concept of stress itself, the formula is a construct, for the easier visualization of forces acting on a soil mass, especially simple analysis models for slope stability, involving a slip plane. With these models, it is important to know the total weight of the soil above (including water), and the pore water pressure within the slip plane, assuming it is acting as a confined layer.

However, the formula becomes confusing when considering the true behaviour of the soil particles under different measurable conditions, since none of the parameters are actually independent actors on the particles.

Consider a grouping of round quartz sand grains, piled loosely, in a classic "cannonball" arrangement. As can be seen, there is a contact stress where the spheres actually touch. Pile on more spheres and the contact stresses increase, to the point of causing frictional instability (dynamic friction), and perhaps failure. The independent parameter affecting the contacts (both normal and shear) is the force of the spheres above.  This can be calculated by using the overall average density of the spheres and the height of spheres above.

If we then have these spheres in a beaker and add some water, they will begin to float a little depending on their density (buoyancy). With natural soil materials, the effect can be significant, as anyone who has lifted a large rock out of a lake can attest.  The contact stress on the spheres decreases as the beaker is filled to the top of the spheres, but then nothing changes if more water is added.  Although the water pressure between the spheres (pore water pressure) is increasing, the effective stress remains the same, because the concept of "total stress" includes the weight of all the water above. This is where the equation can become confusing, and the effective stress can be calculated using the buoyant density of the spheres (soil), and the height of the soil above.

The concept of effective stress truly becomes interesting when dealing with non-hydrostatic pore water pressure. Under the conditions of a pore pressure gradient, the ground water flows, according to the permeability equation (Darcy's law).  Using our spheres as a model, this is the same as injecting (or withdrawing) water between the spheres. If water is being injected, the seepage force acts to separate the spheres and reduces the effective stress. Thus, the soil mass becomes weaker. If water is being withdrawn, the spheres are forced together and the effective stress increases.

Two extremes of this effect are quicksand, where the groundwater gradient and seepage force act against gravity;  and the "sandcastle effect", where the water drainage and capillary action act to strengthen the sand.  As well, effective stress plays an important role in slope stability, and other geotechnical engineering and engineering geology problems, such as groundwater-related subsidence.

References 

 Terzaghi, K. (1925). Principles of Soil Mechanics. Engineering News-Record, 95(19-27).

Soil mechanics